The third season of Numbers, an American television series, premiered on September 22, 2006 with the episode "Spree" and had its season finale "The Janus List" on May 18, 2007. Charlie and Amita intensify their relationship, as do Larry and Megan. Amita has troubles adjusting in her new role as a CalSci professor, and Larry announces his leave of absence—he will be on the space station for six months, which greatly distresses Charlie. Dr. Mildred Finch, the newly appointed Chair of the CalSci Physics, Mathematics, and Astronomy Division, initially troubles Charlie and his colleagues, as Alan dates her. Don dates Agent Liz Warner, questions his ethics and self-worth, and receives counseling. Charlie sees Don's therapist and the two understand one another more. Alan engages in some FBI consulting with his knowledge of engineering, and Larry returns from the space station, although disillusioned. The finale wraps up with a revelation that shakes the whole team.

Cast

Main 
 Rob Morrow as Don Eppes
 David Krumholtz as Charlie Eppes
 Judd Hirsch as Alan Eppes
 Alimi Ballard as David Sinclair
 Navi Rawat as Amita Ramanujan
 Diane Farr as Megan Reeves
 Dylan Bruno as Colby Granger
 Peter MacNicol as Larry Fleinhardt

Recurring 
 Aya Sumika as Liz Warner
 Lou Diamond Phillips as Ian Edgerton
 Kathy Najimy as Dr. Mildred "Millie" Finch
 Jay Baruchel as Oswald Kittner
 Michelle Nolden as AUSA Robin Brooks
 Will Patton as Lt. Gary Walker
 Wendell Pierce as William Bradford

Guest

Episodes

References 
NOTE: Refs Need Archive Backup URLs @ https://archive.org/web/

External links 
 

3
3
2006 American television seasons
2007 American television seasons